Hushang, Hooshang, Hoshang or Houshang, is a Persian male given name popular in Iran. It means "of the good choice." It also means intelligence and/or awareness.

Etymology
Haošyaŋha is the Avestan development of Proto-Iranian *Haušyahah, containing the prefix *Hau-, a derived form of *Hu-, "good, well", and an uncertain root šyah-, possibly to be interpreted as "selecting" or "deciding".  ُThe name might then be interpreted "of the good choice". 

The following people have the given name Hushang:

Hushang, a character in the Persian epic Shahnameh
Hushang Ansary (born 1926), Iranian-American former diplomat, businessman, and philanthropist
Hushang Ebtehaj, Iranian poet
Hushang Hamidi (born in Iran) is an Iranian Kurdish politician
Hushang Irani (1925–1973), Iranian poet, translator, critics, journalist and painter
Hushang of Shirvan, the 32nd ruler of Shirvan and last member of the Kasranid branch of House of Shirvanshah
Hushang Shah, medieval ruler of Malwa, India
Hushang Mirza (1604–1628), Indian prince, grandson of the Mughal Emperor Akbar

See also
Husan
Houshang

Persian masculine given names